The 2017–18 FC Pune City season will be the club's fourth season since its establishment in 2014 and their fourth season in the Indian Super League.This will be the first season for coach Ranko Popović with the club. He replaced Antonio López Habas middle of the pre–season.

Background

Pune City finished sixth in 2016 ISL season and failed to qualify for the semifinals.

Player movement
Due to the Indian Super League regulation each club was allowed to retain a maximum of two Indian players over the age of twenty-one (21) and 3 under-21 players from previous squad. Pune City retained goalkeeper Vishal Kaith and an under-21 forward Ashique Kuruniyan. On 10 July Pune City announced signing of Uruguayan striker Emiliano Alfaro.

In ISL players draft held on 23 July 2017, Pune City picked 14 players to the squad. Pune City picked goalkeeper Kamaljit Singh and added defenders Adil Khan, Lalchhuanmawia, Nim Dorjee Tamang, Harpreet Singh, Wayne Vaz, Gurtej Singh and Pawan Kumar from draft. Pune City added midfielders Kean Lewis, Jewel Raja, Isaac Vanmalsawma and Rohit Kumar to the squad and also picked forwards Baljit Sahni and Ajay Singh from draft.

On 4 August Pune City announce signing of Spanish midfielder Marcos Tébar. The club announced signing of Brazilian forward Marcelinho on 21 August. On 23 August Pune City announced their next signing Spanish defender Rafa Lopez Gomez. On 24 August Pune city announced signing of midfielder Jonatan Lucca. The club then announced signing Croatian defender Damir Grgic on 29 August.
Pune City on 8 September announced their seventh foreigner as Brazilian forward Diego Carlos. Pune City signed their last foreigner Argentinian midfielder Robertino Pugliara on 12 August.

In

Out

Pre-season and friendlies
Pune City stayed at Pune for pre-season. The club played their first friendly against DSK Shivajians U18 on 30 September and won 3–0. Goals scored by Kean Lewis, Adil Khan and Gaurav Bora. Then in next friendly against Chanmari Pune City won 5–0 on 16 October. Jonatan Lucca, Emiliano Alfaro, Rohit, Ajay Singh and Isaac scored a goal each for the club. Pune City Played East Bengal on 30 October and won 2–1. Lucca and Alfaro scored for Pune City. Mahmoud Amnah scored for East Bengal from penalty. Pune City played their next friendly against Mohun Bagan and won it 4–1. Alfaro scored brace, while Ajay Singh and Isaac scored a goal each for Pune City. 
Dipanda pulled one back for Mohun Bagan. Pune City played a 2–2 draw against Chennaiyin in their last friendly. Marcelinho and Diego Carlos scored for Pune City. Baoringdao Bodo scored the first goal for Chennaiyin and the second goal was an own goal.

Indian Super League

November
Pune City started with 2–3 loss against Delhi Dynamos in their first match of 2017–18 Indian Super League season at home on 22 November. Paulinho Dias opened the scoring for Delhi in the 46th minute, while Lallianzuala Chhangte and Matías Mirabaje netted in the 54th and 65th minute, respectively. Emiliano Alfaro scored Pune’s first goal of the match in the 67th minute and Marcos Tebar netted their second in injury–time.

Table

Matches

Technical staff

Players statistics

Top scorers

Source: soccerway
Updated: 24 January 2018

Clean sheets

Source: soccerway
Updated: 24 January 2018

Disciplinary record

Source: soccerway
Updated: 30 December 2017

See also
 2017–18 in Indian football

Notes

References

FC Pune City seasons
Pune City